Alain Blottière (born 1954 in Neuilly-sur-Seine) is a French writer

Works 
1980: Saad, novel, Éditions Gallimard, coll. « Le Chemin », Paris, . Prix littéraire de la vocation.
1985: Le Point d'eau, novel, Gallimard, 
1990: Intérieur bleu, novel, 
1992: L'Oasis: Siwa, tale, Quai Voltaire,  
1995: L'Enchantement, novel, Calmann-Lévy, ; Prix Valery-Larbaud
1998: Si-Amonn, novel, Mercure de France, 
1999: Tableaux des oasis égyptiennes, tale, Arthaud, 
2000: Petit dictionnaire des dieux égyptiens , .
2003: Un voyage en Égypte au temps des derniers rois, tale, Flammarion, .
2007: Comme une image, récit, in La Nouvelle Revue française n° 582, Gallimard, 
2008: Aimer encore l'Égypte, préface à Fils de roi, Portraits d'Égypte by Denis Dailleux, photographs, Gallimard, .
2009: Le Tombeau de Tommy, novel, Gallimard, ; paperback edition: Folio (Gallimard) n° 5203, Paris, 2011 .
2012: Rêveurs, novel, Gallimard, 
2012: Houdi, short story, Artist's book with five numbered copies, with illustrations by Jean-Pierre Thomas.
2013: Mon île au trésor - Dans les sables de Libye, tale, Arthaud, 
2016: Comment Baptiste est mort, novel, Gallimard, . Prix Mottart de l'Académie française, Prix Décembre 2016, Grand prix Jean Giono 2016.
2020: Azur noir, novel, Gallimard, .

References

External links 
 Personal site
 Site devoted to Tombeau de Tommy by Alain Blottière
 First interview on Apostrophes, in 1981
 Interview à propos du Tombeau de Tommy

20th-century French non-fiction writers
20th-century French male writers
21st-century French non-fiction writers
Prix Décembre winners
Prix Valery Larbaud winners
1954 births
People from Neuilly-sur-Seine
Living people